Highways in the Czech Republic are managed by the state-owned Road and Motorway Directorate of the Czech Republic – ŘSD ČR, established in 1997. The ŘSD currently (september 2022) manages and maintains 1,355 km of motorways (dálnice), whose speed limit is of 130 km/h or 80 mph (or 80 km/h or 50 mph within a town). The present-day national motorway network is due to be of about 2,000 km before 2030.

Network map

Toll requirements

Motorcars up to 3.5 tonnes 
Until 2021, for motorcars with a maximum authorized mass of up to 3.5 tonnes, motorways in the Czech Republic (with some exceptions, see below) were subject to a time-based fee (časový poplatek) paid with the purchase of a windscreen toll vignette (dálniční známka or dálniční kupón) with a validity of either 10 days (310 CZK), 1 month (440 CZK) or 1 year  (valid from 1 December 2017 to 31 January 2019) (1500 CZK). 

In 2021 the system was changed to electronic time-based fee paid online or in selected selling places with validity of 10 days (310 CZK), 1 month (440 CZK) or 365 days (1500 CZK).

Generally said, a motorway road sign  means that a paid e-vignette toll is obligatory (usually not immediately from the border on). Only sections not subject to e-vignette are designated with an additional road sign (see below).

For 2023, the following motorway sections are subject to the time-based fee for motor cars up to 3.5 t:

Vehicles over 3.5 tonnes 
As of 1 January 2007 a new system of electronic toll aka a distance toll for vehicles with a weight exceeding 12 tons has been introduced for motorways and some roads of the first class (silnice první třídy), totally cca 200 km. As of 1 January 2010, this applies also to vehicles over 3.5 tons. There is an ongoing public discussion on imposition of electronic toll for all cars and vehicles.

History of Czech motorways

Before the Second World War 

The first informal plan for a motorway (first called in Czech autostráda or dálková silnice) in Czechoslovakia date back to 1935. This was to link Prague through Slovakia with the easternmost Czechoslovak territory, Carpathian Ruthenia (now Zakarpattia Oblast in Ukraine). The terminus was to be at Velykyy Bychkiv (Velký Bočkov in Czech) on the Romanian border. The definitive route, including a Prague ring motorway, was approved shortly after the Munich Agreement on 4 November 1938, with a planned speed limit of 120 km/h.

The Nazi authorities also made the second Czecho-Slovak Republic, already a German satellite state, build a part of the Reichsautobahn Breslau - Vienna as an extraterritorial German motorway with border checkpoints at each motorway exit. However, only a construction of the route within Bohemia and Moravia was initiated, but never finished. It still sporadically appears in some current Czech motorway plans.

On 1 December 1938 Nazi Germany had already initiated a construction of the so-called Sudetenautobahn (in Sudetenland, before the Munich agreement part of Czechoslovakia, then of Germany) in the route Streitau (Bavaria) – Eger – Carlsbad – Lobositz – Böhmisch Leipa – Reichenberg (capital of Sudetenland) – Görlitz (in Prussia, now in Saxony). The autobahn has never been finished, but some remnants in the landscape close to Pomezí nad Ohří, Cheb/Eger and Liberec/Reichenberg are still prominent and an unfinished part from Svárov via Machnín to Chrastava was used in the construction of the I/35 road.

Nazi occupation 
Czechoslovakia was broken up with a declaration of independence by the Slovak Republic and by the short-lived Carpatho-Ukraine which was a prelude to the German occupation of Bohemia and Moravia on 15 March 1939. It was decided to build the motorway only as far as the Slovak border. The technical parameters of motorways (speed limit of 140 – 160 km/h) were adjusted to those of the German Reichsautobahn, as Czech (Bohemian-Moravian) motorways were to be integrated within the German Reichsautobahn network.

The project for the first segment Prague - Lužná was ready in January 1939, and construction in Moravia began on 24 January in Chřiby on the Zástřizly - Lužná segment. The construction in Bohemia from Prague began on 2 May 1939, with a switch to right-hand traffic in Bohemia and Moravia having already gone without a hitch. The motorway should have reached Brno in 1940, but building materials and labour shortages due to an absolute priority given to the Nazi armament industry delayed the work considerably. The construction in the route of approx. 77 km from Prague towards Brno advanced notably, but a prohibition of all civil constructions by the German authorities came into force in 1942.

After the Second World War 
After the Second World War, the completion of only the first and unfinished 77 km of the motorway Prague – Brno as far as Humpolec was approved by the Government in November 1945 and was reinaugurated in 1946. The part-built construction sites of the Sudetenautobahn (28 km) were completely abandoned, as well as that of the Breslau – Vienna motorway (84 km). The latter was, however, incorporated in some plans as a future connection motorway between Brno and the D35 motorway. The 77 km of the Prague – Humpolec motorway had been completed except for some large bridges and a concrete surface when the new communist government decided to discontinue the work completely in early 1950.

Only on 8 August 1967 the Government of the Socialist Republic of Czechoslovakia resolved to continue the construction of motorways by adopting a new motorway plan for the whole country and resolved to continue the already twice interrupted construction of the motorway Prague - Brno (number D1) and further Brno - Bratislava (D2). The construction was solemnly inaugurated on 8 September 1967. Due to a change of technical parameters, some bridges finished before 1950 were replaced. The Prague - Brno motorway (D1), initiated on 2 May 1939, reached Brno in 1980, a full 40 years after the originally scheduled opening.

The pace of construction of highways has always been rather slow up to the present day. The first 100 km of highways on the territory of today's Czech Republic were completed in 1975, 500 km in 1985 and 1,000 km in 2007. Funding for the construction of highways was radically reduced after the financial crisis in 2008 due to draconian budget cuts, and is currently gaining momentum rather slowly for various reasons.

Motorways 

The motorways in the Czech Republic,  (abbr. D), are defined as two-lane motorways in each direction, with an emergency lane. The speed limit is 130 km/h or 80 mph. Their highway shields are white on red and road signs are white on green. As of 1 January 2016, the Czech motorway network comprises 18 motorways. Nowadays, 17 of them are at least partially operational, but only 5 (D2, D5, D8, D10, D46 and D56) have been completed, another one (D1) are near completion,D1 by the end of 2024, by outer source in October 2022.

The number of a motorway reflects a number of the previous national road alongside which it was built up or which it shall replace. After the construction of the motorway, the affected national road is degraded to a regional road with a number beginning on 6 and having 3 digits. For instance, after the completion of the D8 motorway (Prague - Lovosice), the previous national road no. I/8 between Prague and Lovosice became a regional road no. 608. Regional roads are maintained by the self-governing regions (kraj) and not by the state directly.

Originally, a motorway D47 was planned from Brno to Ostrava and construction in the section Lipník nad Bečvou - Ostrava under this number even started, but in the end the ŘSD in 2006 decided that the D47 should be classified as an extension of the D1 motorway.

Roads for motorcars 

The category of roads for motorcars (Silnice pro motorová vozidla) was changed on 31 December 2015. Most roads for motorcars were classified as fully fledged motorways, while some sections remained in the same category. The speed limit for most existing roads for motorcars was reduced to 110 km/h.

As of 2016, roads for motorcars are not subject to highway tolls for vehicles with total weight up to 3.5 t. The signs on roads for motorcars consist of white text on a blue background, like on other common roads and unlike on motorways, where the background is green. Exits, like on motorways, are usually numbered.

It is in the jurisdiction of individual regions (kraje) to decide whether roads for motorcars should have higher speed limits than regular roads. An example of this is the expressway R35 between Liberec and Turnov which has not been classified as of 1 January 2016 as a motorway but an exceptional speed limit of up to 130 km/h was kept using road signs.

List of completed roads for motorcars 

Planned upgrade to road for motorcars:
 I/7 Spořice - Křimov
 I/13 Chomutov - Teplice (some parts)
 I/13 Ostrov - Karlovy Vary
 I/11 Ostrava-Vítkovice - Šenov
 I/14 Liberec: interchange I/35 - roundabout Kunratice (direction Jablonec n. N.)
 I/34 České Budějovice - Lišov, interchange Na Klaudě St. (after completion of the interchange Úsilné between motorway D3 and I/34)
 I/35 roundabout Hrádek nad Nisou - Liberec, interchange Hodkovická St.(inc. border road, only a single carriageway road)

Opening of new motorways 

Construction of new motorways in recent years has been hampered due to corruption scandals and austerity measures as well as owing to new European rules under which old EIA assessments lapsed. See the table below. However, this should improve slightly in next years. By the end of 2017, there were 58.2 km of new motorways under construction, in 2018 a construction of further 130.3 km should be initiated (apart from the ongoing reconstruction of the motorway D1). Nonetheless, only 18.1 km of new motorways may open to public in 2018, 18.8 km in 2019 and 29.7 in 2020.

Between 1971 and 2014 the average year pace of completion of new highways was 28.2 km a year.

See also
 Transport in the Czech Republic
 List of controlled-access highway systems
 Evolution of motorway construction in European countries

References

External links

 ŘSD official web site

 
Highways